A cylindrical joint is a two-degrees-of-freedom kinematic pair used in mechanisms.  Cylindrical joints constrain two bodies to a single axis while allowing them to rotate about and slide along that axis. This can be pictured by an unsecured axle mounted on a chassis, as it may freely rotate and translate. An example of this would be the rotating rods of a table football.

See also
 Degrees of freedom (mechanics)
 Kinematic pair
 Kinematics
 Prismatic joint
 Revolute joint

References 

Kinematics
Rigid bodies